The following is a list of notable massacres in Colombia. According to the Grupo de Memoria Histórica, there were 2505 massacres in Colombia between 1973 and 2008. The Colombian government defines "massacre" as the killing of 4 or more people in the same act.

See also

 Right-wing paramilitarism in Colombia

References

Colombia
Massacres

Human rights abuses in Colombia
Massacres